Nicky Zijlaard (born 21 November 1995) is a former Dutch professional racing cyclist.

Cycling family
Zijlaard comes from a renowned cycling family. Grandfather Joop Zijlaard is a famous former pacer and he ran a pub named after his moustache (NL: snor). Dad Ron took over both pacing and the family business. Uncle Michael is a former cyclist who's most famous for marrying and supporting Leontien van Moorsel, managing women's professional team AA Drink–leontien.nl, men's Pro Continental team Roompot and organising the Six Days of Rotterdam. Brother Maikel Zijlaard is also a professional cyclist.

Nicky Zijlaard married professional cyclist Nick van der Lijke with whom she has a daughter. In 2022 they briefly took over Crossanterie De Snor, but due to her health issues they handed the business back to her parents.

Main results

2011
1st  Dutch National Track Championships - junior women: individual pursuit, points race and scratch.
6th Dutch National Championships Madison, women elite
2012
3rd Dutch National Championships Road Race, junior women
4th Dutch National Championships Madison, women elite, with Nina Kessler
9th 2012 UCI Road World Championships – Women's junior time trial
2013
1st Individual time trial and overall win Omloop van Borsele junior edition
6th 2013 European Road Championships – Women's junior time trial
2014 
1st  Dutch national derny champion, women elite, with her father Ron as pacer
2nd Dutch National Championships Madison, women elite, with Nina Kessler.

See also
 2014 Boels Dolmans Cycling Team season

References

External links
 

1995 births
Living people
Dutch female cyclists
Cyclists from Rotterdam
21st-century Dutch women